Suleiman Camara Sanneh (born 7 December 2001) is a Spanish footballer who plays for UD Ibiza as a right winger.

Club career
Born in Sant Celoni, Barcelona, Catalonia, Camara joined Girona FC's youth setup from CE Sabadell FC in 2018. He was promoted to the reserves in the Tercera División for the 2020–21 season, and made his senior debut on 18 October 2020 by playing the last ten minutes of a 3–0 away win over UE Figueres.

Camara scored his first senior goal on 25 October 2020, netting the third of a 3–0 home win over UE Vilassar de Mar. He made his first-team debut on 2 December of the following year, replacing Pol Lozano in a 5–1 away routing of Calvo Sotelo Puertollano CF in the season's Copa del Rey.

Camara made his professional debut on 14 December 2021, replacing fellow youth graduate Ricard Artero in a 1–0 away success over SD Huesca, also in the national cup. On 1 July of the following year, he signed a three-year contract with Segunda División side UD Ibiza.

After impressing during the pre-season, Camara made his second division debut on 14 August 2022, starting in a 2–0 home loss against Granada CF. He scored his first professional goal fourteen days later, netting the opener in a 1–1 home draw against Deportivo Alavés.

References

External links

2001 births
Living people
People from Vallès Oriental
Spanish footballers
Footballers from Catalonia
Association football wingers
Segunda División players
Tercera División players
Tercera Federación players
Girona FC B players
Girona FC players
UD Ibiza players
Spanish sportspeople of African descent